Adkisson is a surname. People with this surname include:

 James Adkisson (born 1980), American football tight end
 Janet Hopps Adkisson (born 1934), American professional tennis player
 Jim David Adkisson (born 1950), perpetrator of the 2008 Tennessee Unitarian Church shooting
 Perry Adkisson (1929–2020), Chancellor of the Texas A&M University System
 Richard B. Adkisson (1932–2011), chief justice of the Arkansas Supreme Court
 Tommy Adkisson (fl. 1990s–2020s), American professional Foosball player

See also
Adkisson SJ-1 Head Skinner, single-seater gull-wing sports plane built 1957 by Earl and Jerry Adkisson
Von Erich family, a family of American professional wrestlers with the birth name of Adkisson